Gettysburg: The Turning Point is a 1986 strategy game by Strategic Simulations for the Atari 8-bit family, Apple II, Commodore 64, Amiga, and IBM PC compatibles. An Atari ST version was announced but not released.

Gameplay

Gettysburg: The Turning Point is the first in a series of American Civil War games, and was the first to experiment with a randomized reinforcement schedule for the order of battle.

Reception
Ed Curtis reviewed the game for Computer Gaming World, and stated that "There is little question in my mind that GTP is one of the most enjoyable "conflict simulations" (read--war games) that it has been my pleasure to play in a very long time. After years of interest in the factors leading up to, and the conduct of the American Civil War, it is a very welcome addition to the growing number of games on this subject and possibly the best currently available."

R. F. Batchelder reviewed the game for Computer Gaming World, and stated that "Gettysburg is an award winner and the Amiga port definitely enhances this program. Therefore, it you should be able to concur with me that this improved version is definitely worth the price."

Gettysburg, the Turning Point was awarded the Charles S. Roberts Award for "Best Military or Strategy Computer Game of 1986".

The game was named by Computer Gaming World as the Strategy Game of the Year in 1987. In 1996, Computer Gaming World declared Gettysburg: The Turning Point the 59th-best computer game ever released. The magazine's wargame columnist Terry Coleman named it his pick for the fifth-best computer wargame released by late 1996.

Reviews
Computer and Video Games (Aug, 1987)

References

1986 video games
American Civil War video games
Amiga games
Atari 8-bit family games
Commodore 64 games
Computer wargames
DOS games
Origins Award winners
Strategic Simulations games
Video games developed in the United States

External links
Gettysburg: The Turning Point for the Atari 8-bit family at Atari Mania

Review in Compute!
Review in Antic
Review in ANALOG Computing
Review in Family Computing
Review in InCider
Review in Compute!'s Gazette
Article in Atari Interface